Group 2 of the UEFA Euro 1976 qualifying tournament was one of the eight groups to decide which teams would qualify for the UEFA Euro 1976 finals tournament. Group 2 consisted of four teams: Wales, Hungary, Austria, and Luxembourg, where they played against each other home-and-away in a round-robin format. The group winners were Wales, who finished three points above Hungary.

Final table

Matches

Goalscorers

References

Group 2
1974–75 in Welsh football
1975–76 in Welsh football
1974–75 in Hungarian football
1975–76 in Hungarian football
1974–75 in Austrian football
1975–76 in Austrian football